The 1907 Syracuse Orangemen football team represented Syracuse University during the 1907 college football season. The head coach was Frank "Buck" O'Neill, coaching his second season with the Orangemen.

This was the first year the team played their home games at the on-campus Archbold Stadium. The 20,000-seat venue was one of the finest facilities of its time and was once called the "Eighth Wonder of the World". The football program notched its 100th victory against Hamilton on October 26. Bill Horr became the Syracuse's first All-American when he was named to Walter Camp's "Second Eleven."

Schedule

Source:

References

Syracuse
Syracuse Orange football seasons
Syracuse Orangemen football